The  is art museum located in the city of Gifu, Gifu Prefecture, Japan. The focus of the museum is on art and artists related to Gifu Prefecture, but the museum also collects pieces from other places in Japan and overseas.

References

External links

Museum of Fine Arts, Gifu
Museums in Gifu Prefecture
Art museums and galleries in Japan
Art museums established in 1982
Museum of Fine Arts, Gifu